"Gangsta" is a song performed by American contemporary R&B group Bell Biv DeVoe, issued as a stand-alone single in 1993 via MCA Records. The song peaked at #21 on the Billboard Hot 100. The song was also featured on an episode of The Fresh Prince of Bel-Air.

Music video

The official music video for the song was directed by Lionel C. Martin.

Chart positions

References

External links
 
 

1991 songs
1993 singles
Bell Biv DeVoe songs
MCA Records singles
Music videos directed by Lionel C. Martin
Song recordings produced by Dr. Freeze
Songs written by Dr. Freeze